Der Blutharsch was an Austrian martial industrial, neofolk and psychedelic rock project created in 1996 by Albin Julius. 

Group leader Albin Julius died on 4 May 2022.

History
Originally a side project to The Moon lay hidden beneath a Cloud, Julius' first release as Der Blutharsch was a self-titled picture disc (1996), limited to 250 copies. Early Der Blutharsch recorded material was very dark ambient in sound, heavy on historic samples and post-industrial melodic drones. As the discography progressed, the material became more lively, with the more bombastic approach and a focus on a form of martial industrial with emphasis on neoclassical instrumentation combined with experimentalism. Subject matter and imagery largely derived from historical topics relating to the history of Germanic Europe.

With the release of Time Is Thee Enemy! in 2003, Julius took Der Blutharsch into the direction of a grunge band. Gone were the martial aspects of Der Blutharsch, only apparent to some extent in promotional imagery. Instead of a one-man project, promotional material showcased the project as a fleshed out group. Live shows continued in this direction with a focus on placing the group further into the area of psychedelic rock. Subsequently, any traces of the previous focus on historical themes disappeared with new promotional imagery showcasing references to psychedelic pop art.

Julius released all Der Blutharsch material on his own record label, WKN (Wir Kapitulieren Niemals). This translates from German to English as We will never surrender.

Live
Live, Der Blutharsch started as a one-man electronic music show. Later, Albin Julius performed as a two or three man show, with martial drumming and spoken (or shouted) lyrics. This can be seen in the Gold Gab Ich Für Eisen (1999) and God Blast America! (filmed 2002, released 2011) videos. Later, Der Blutharsch became a full band, with acoustic instruments and female vocal accompaniment. Julius has since enlisted several musicians as "full time" members of the group with the setup of a traditional rock band. In September 2009 they played at the Incubate (festival) in Tilburg, Netherlands.

Symbolism and aesthetics
Originally, Der Blutharsch used a logo that was a single Sig Rune within a triangular shield, reading 'Der Blutharsch' in the upper portion of the triangle in a Fraktur font. This appeared on most early Der Blutharsch vinyl releases and on the original Der Blutharsch website, but was replaced on later pressings by the new logo. On later Der Blutharsch releases, the original Sig Rune logo was replaced with an iron cross embellished with oak leaves. Reissues of old material also excluded the previous logo in favor of the 'new' logo.

Controversy
Julius' output is often described as neo-fascist owing to his frequent use of military-related themes and fascist aesthetics, including Third Reich-era material, in the composition of his works. Der Blutharsch released 7" split singles with the Italian neo-fascist bands Zetazeroalfa and Sotto Fascia Semplice and Austrian doom metal band Our Survival Depends On Us, but has also worked with the anarchist industrial band Terroritmo, now called Wakinyan. In 2004, Der Blutharsch was forced to cancel a performance in Israel after protests from members of the Israeli cabinet and Knesset, the mayor of Tel Aviv, and the Anti-Defamation League.

References

External links
Official Website
Der Blutharsch at Bandcamp
Der Blutharsch discography at Discogs
Der Blutharsch discography at MusicBrainz

Austrian industrial music groups
Neofolk music groups
Martial industrial groups
Musical groups established in 1996
Musical groups disestablished in 2022
Neo-Nazism in Austria
1996 establishments in Austria
2022 disestablishments in Austria